Darryl Donald Smith (born 8 June 1960) is a former Australian cricketer who played several matches for Western Australia during the early 1980s.

Born in Adelaide, South Australia, Smith played colts and under-19 cricket for Western Australia, and was subsequently chosen to captain the Australian under-19 cricket team in two Tests and one One Day International against the touring England under-19 side during the 1978–79 season.

A right-handed all-rounder bowling medium pace, he debuted at state level during the 1980–81 season, playing a single match for Western Australia in the limited-overs McDonald's Cup. In the match, played against Victoria at the WACA Ground in February 1981, Smith scored 42 runs from 23 balls, an innings which included three sixes. He again played one match for Western Australia in the following season's competition, and subsequently spent the 1982 English season playing for the Accrington Cricket Club in the Lancashire League. His season as the club's professional was not entirely successful—from 26 matches, he took 45 wickets at an average of 21.26, but scored only 382 runs at an average of 18.19, with one century and no half-centuries.

Smith did not again play for Western Australia until the 1984–85 season, when he played two limited-overs matches, as well as his first and only first-class match. His sole first-class match was played against the touring Sri Lankans, and he took two wickets in Sri Lanka's first innings.

See also
 List of Western Australia first-class cricketers

References

External links
Ahead of the game, and then it passed him by – Retrieved 20 December 2013

1960 births
Australian cricketers
Living people
Cricketers from Adelaide
Western Australia cricketers